Phil-Ellena was the stately home of George Washington Carpenter in Germantown, Pennsylvania, now the West Mount Airy neighborhood of Philadelphia. The house was constructed in 1845 and demolished in 1892 during development of the Mount Airy neighborhood.

History
In 1836 Carpenter purchased over 500 acres of land in Germantown. He subdivided some of the property, but on a 300-acre parcel near what is now the intersection of Germantown Avenue and Pelham Road he constructed his country estate known as Phil-Ellena. Named for his second wife, Ellen, the Greek Revival house was "one of the most noted homes in the country."

Carpenter, a noted scientist, built a Greek temple on the estate to house his collections of specimens. A greenhouse contained his botanical studies, and a 65-foot clock tower signaled the time.

After Carpenter's death in 1860, his second wife, Ellen, inherited the estate. When the estate was demolished in 1898, Carpenter's botanical collection was given to the Philadelphia Horticulture Center, and his museum specimens were transferred to the Academy of Natural Sciences of Philadelphia. The clock tower was demolished in 1902.

Visitors to Phil-Ellena included Thomas Nuttall and John James Audubon.

East and West Phil Ellena Street and Pelham Road
Two segments of West Phil Ellena Street are included within the boundaries of the former estate, and Germantown Avenue separates West Phil Ellena Street from East Phil Ellena Street. Pelham was an alternative name for Carpenter's house, and Pelham Road runs through the former estate.

National Register of Historic Places
Within the former boundaries of Phil-Ellena, sites listed on the National Register of Historic Places include the following:
 Daniel Billmeyer House
 Malvern Hall
 McCallum Manor
 Robert M. Hogue House

References

External links
 
 Mikelberg, A Decorative Analysis of Phil-Ellena, a Greek Revival, Philadelphia Mansion 
 Carpenter, A Brief Description of Phil-Ellena
 

Houses completed in 1844
Buildings and structures demolished in 1892
Demolished buildings and structures in Philadelphia
Germantown, Philadelphia
Mount Airy, Philadelphia
History of Philadelphia
Greek Revival houses in Pennsylvania